is a Japanese former footballer.

Career statistics

Club

Notes

References

1991 births
Living people
People from Hachiōji, Tokyo
Sportspeople from Tokyo Metropolis
Association football people from Tokyo Metropolis
Tokyo International University alumni
Japanese footballers
Association football forwards
Albirex Niigata Singapore FC players
Singapore Premier League players
Japanese expatriate sportspeople in Singapore
Expatriate footballers in Singapore